William Brinsley Nicholson  (26 August 1877 – 25 November 1957) was a New Zealand clerk, local politician, builder, journalist and editor. He was born in Opotiki, New Zealand, on 26 August 1877. He was elected to the Petone Borough Council aged 23. He was appointed a Member of the Order of the British Empire in the 1949 New Year Honours for long services in local government and education.

References

1877 births
1957 deaths
Local politicians in New Zealand
People from Wellington City
New Zealand journalists
People from Ōpōtiki
New Zealand Members of the Order of the British Empire